The Dwight–Derby House is at 7 Frairy Street in Medfield, Massachusetts. The Oxford Dendrochronology Laboratory took samples of the house frame in 2007 and determined that the earliest, southwest portion of the house was built in 1697, and an addition was built to the east in 1713. The town bought the house in 1996, and it was listed on the National Register of Historic Places in 2002.

History
John Dwight, son of Timothy and Mary Dwight, married in 1696 and built the earliest section of the house in 1697. The second family who owned and occupied the house, for another four generations, was the Derby family, starting with John Derby, grandson of Elias Hasket Derby, of Salem, Massachusetts, America's first millionaire.

Today
Today, the Dwight–Derby House sits on a half acre lot in its original location overlooking Meeting House Pond.

Shortly after the Dwight–Derby House was bought by the town of Medfield in 1996, the Friends of the Dwight–Derby House, Inc. was formed to restore, manage and share its historical significance with the community. Thanks to generous donations, grants from the Massachusetts Historical Commission and the National Trust, the house has been able to endure structural and exterior repairs.

See also
 List of the oldest buildings in Massachusetts
 National Register of Historic Places listings in Norfolk County, Massachusetts

Notes

References

External links
 Town of Medfield – Dwight–Derby House
 Heritage Landscapes information

Historic house museums in Massachusetts
Museums in Norfolk County, Massachusetts
Houses completed in 1697
Medfield, Massachusetts
Houses on the National Register of Historic Places in Norfolk County, Massachusetts
Houses in Norfolk County, Massachusetts
1697 establishments in Massachusetts